In complex analysis, a branch of mathematics, a generalized continued fraction is a generalization of regular continued fractions in canonical form, in which the partial numerators and partial denominators can assume arbitrary complex values.

A generalized continued fraction is an expression of the form

The successive convergents of the continued fraction are formed by applying the fundamental recurrence formulas:

They are given by the recursion 

with initial values

If the sequence of convergents  approaches a limit the continued fraction is convergent and has a definite value. If the sequence of convergents never approaches a limit the continued fraction is divergent. It may diverge by oscillation (for example, the odd and even convergents may approach two different limits), or it may produce an infinite number of zero denominators .

History 

That algorithm introduced the idea of dividing to extract a new remainder – and then dividing by the new remainder repeatedly.

Nearly two thousand years passed before  devised a technique for approximating the roots of quadratic equations with continued fractions in the mid-sixteenth century. Now the pace of development quickened. Just 24 years later, in 1613, Pietro Cataldi introduced the first formal notation for the generalized continued fraction. Cataldi represented a continued fraction as

with the dots indicating where the next fraction goes, and each  representing a modern plus sign.

Late in the seventeenth century John Wallis introduced the term "continued fraction" into mathematical literature. New techniques for mathematical analysis  (Newton's and Leibniz's calculus) had recently come onto the scene, and a generation of Wallis' contemporaries put the new phrase to use.

In 1748 Euler published a theorem showing that a particular kind of continued fraction is equivalent to a certain very general infinite series. Euler's continued fraction formula is still the basis of many modern proofs of convergence of continued fractions.

In 1761, Johann Heinrich Lambert gave the first proof that  is irrational, by using the following continued fraction for :

Continued fractions can also be applied to problems in number theory, and are especially useful in the study of Diophantine equations. In the late eighteenth century Lagrange used continued fractions to construct the general solution of Pell's equation, thus answering a question that had fascinated mathematicians for more than a thousand years. Amazingly, Lagrange's discovery implies that the canonical continued fraction expansion of the square root of every non-square integer is periodic and that, if the period is of length , it contains a palindromic string of length .

In 1813 Gauss derived from complex-valued hypergeometric functions what is now called Gauss's continued fractions. They can be used to express many elementary functions and some more advanced functions (such as the Bessel functions), as continued fractions that are rapidly convergent almost everywhere in the complex plane.

Notation 

The long continued fraction expression displayed in the introduction is easy for an unfamiliar reader to interpret. However, it takes up a lot of space and can be difficult to typeset. So mathematicians have devised several alternative notations. One convenient way to express a generalized continued fraction sets each nested fraction on the same line, indicating the nesting by dangling plus signs in the denominators:

Sometimes the plus signs are typeset to vertically align with the denominators but not under the fraction bars:

Pringsheim wrote a generalized continued fraction this way:

Carl Friedrich Gauss evoked the more familiar infinite product  when he devised this notation:

Here the "" stands for Kettenbruch, the German word for "continued fraction". This is probably the most compact and convenient way to express continued fractions; however, it is not widely used by English typesetters.

Some elementary considerations 

Here are some elementary results that are of fundamental importance in the further development of the analytic theory of continued fractions.

Partial numerators and denominators 

If one of the partial numerators  is zero, the infinite continued fraction

Such an object is of little interest from the point of view adopted in mathematical analysis, so it is usually assumed that all . There is no need to place this restriction on the partial denominators .

The determinant formula 

When the th convergent of a continued fraction

is expressed as a simple fraction  we can use the determinant formula

The proof for this can be easily seen by induction.

Base case

The case  results from a very simple computation.

Inductive step

which is true because of our induction hypothesis.

Specifically, if neither  nor  is zero we can express the difference between the th and th convergents like this:

The equivalence transformation 

If  is any infinite sequence of non-zero complex numbers we can prove, by induction, that

where equality is understood as equivalence, which is to say that the successive convergents of the continued fraction on the left are exactly the same as the convergents of the fraction on the right.

The equivalence transformation is perfectly general, but two particular cases deserve special mention.

Second, if none of the partial denominators  are zero we can use a similar procedure to choose another sequence  to make each partial denominator a 1:

where  and otherwise .

These two special cases of the equivalence transformation are enormously useful when the general convergence problem is analyzed.

Notions of convergence 

As mentioned in the introduction, the continued fraction

converges if the sequence of convergents } tends to a finite limit. This notion of convergence is very natural, but it is sometimes too restrictive. It is therefore useful to introduce the notion of general convergence of a continued fraction. The convergents thus obtained are called modified convergents. The sequence  is then called an exceptional sequence for the continued fraction.

There also exists a notion of absolute convergence for continued fractions, which is based on the notion of absolute convergence of a series: a continued fraction is said to be absolutely convergent when the series

where  are the convergents of the continued fraction, converges absolutely. The Śleszyński–Pringsheim theorem provides a sufficient condition for absolute convergence.

Even and odd convergents 

It is sometimes necessary to separate a continued fraction into its even and odd parts.

The formulas for the even and odd parts of a continued fraction can be written most compactly if the fraction has already been transformed so that all its partial denominators are unity. Specifically, if

is a continued fraction, then the even part  and the odd part  are given by

and

respectively.

Conditions for irrationality

converges to an irrational limit.

Fundamental recurrence formulas

The partial numerators and denominators of the fraction's successive convergents are related by the fundamental recurrence formulas:

The continued fraction's successive convergents are then given by

These recurrence relations are due to John Wallis (1616–1703) and Leonhard Euler (1707–1783).

As an example, consider the regular continued fraction in canonical form that represents the golden ratio :

Since all the partial numerators in this example are equal to one, the determinant formula assures us that the absolute value of the difference between successive convergents approaches zero quite rapidly.

Linear fractional transformations 

A linear fractional transformation (LFT) is a complex function of the form

The linear fractional transformation, also known as a Möbius transformation, has many fascinating properties. Four of these are of primary importance in developing the analytic theory of continued fractions.
If  the LFT has one or two fixed points. This can be seen by considering the equation

If the discriminant  is zero the LFT fixes a single point; otherwise it has two fixed points.

If  the LFT is an invertible conformal mapping of the extended complex plane onto itself. In other words, this LFT has an inverse function

such that  for every point  in the extended complex plane, and both  and  preserve angles and shapes at vanishingly small scales. From the form of  we see that  is also an LFT.

The collection of all such LFTs, together with the "group operation" composition of functions, is known as the automorphism group of the extended complex plane.
If  the LFT reduces to

(See also Laurent series.)

The continued fraction as a composition of LFTs 

Consider a sequence of simple linear fractional transformations

Here we use  to represent each simple LFT, and we adopt the conventional circle notation for composition of functions. We also introduce a new symbol  to represent the composition of  transformations ; that is,

and so forth. By direct substitution from the first set of expressions into the second we see that

and, in general,

where the last partial denominator in the finite continued fraction  is understood to be . And, since , the image of the point  under the iterated LFT  is indeed the value of the finite continued fraction with  partial numerators:

A geometric interpretation 

Defining a finite continued fraction as the image of a point under the iterated linear functional transformation  leads to an intuitively appealing geometric interpretation of infinite continued fractions.

The relationship

In the first of these equations the ratio tends toward  as  tends toward zero. In the second, the ratio tends toward  as  tends to infinity. This leads us to our first geometric interpretation. If the continued fraction converges, the successive convergents  are eventually arbitrarily close together.

where  is a constant, introduced for convenience. But then, by substituting in the expression for  we obtain

Intuitively, it is almost as if the convergent continued fraction maps the entire extended complex plane into a single point.

And every member of that automorphism group maps the extended complex plane into itself: not one of the  can possibly map the plane into a single point. Yet in the limit the sequence  defines an infinite continued fraction which (if it converges) represents a single point in the complex plane.

For divergent continued fractions, we can distinguish three cases:
In this case the continued fraction defined by the sequence  diverges by oscillation between two distinct limit points. And in fact this idea can be generalized: sequences  can be constructed that oscillate among three, or four, or indeed any number of limit points. Interesting instances of this case arise when the sequence  constitutes a subgroup of finite order within the group of automorphisms over the extended complex plane.
 The sequence  may produce an infinite number of zero denominators  while also producing a subsequence of finite convergents. These finite convergents may not repeat themselves or fall into a recognizable oscillating pattern. Or they may converge to a finite limit, or even oscillate among multiple finite limits. No matter how the finite convergents behave, the continued fraction defined by the sequence  diverges by oscillation with the point at infinity in this case.
The sequence  may produce no more than a finite number of zero denominators . while the subsequence of finite convergents dances wildly around the plane in a pattern that never repeats itself and never approaches any finite limit either.

Interesting examples of cases 1 and 3 can be constructed by studying the simple continued fraction

where  is any real number such that .

Euler's continued fraction formula 

Euler proved the following identity:

From this many other results can be derived, such as

and

Examples

Transcendental functions and numbers

Here are two continued fractions that can be built via Euler's identity.

Here are additional generalized continued fractions:

This last is based on an algorithm derived by Aleksei Nikolaevich Khovansky in the 1970s.

Example: the natural logarithm of 2 (=  ≈ 0.693147...):

Here are three of 's best-known generalized continued fractions, the first and third of which are derived from their respective arctangent formulas above by setting  and multiplying by 4. The Leibniz formula for :

converges too slowly, requiring roughly  terms to achieve  correct decimal places. The series derived by Nilakantha Somayaji:

is a much more obvious expression but still converges quite slowly, requiring nearly 50 terms for five decimals and nearly 120 for six. On the other hand:

which adds at least three decimal digits per five terms.
The same  (the silver ratio squared) also is observed in the unfolded general continued fractions of both the natural logarithm of 2 and the th root of 2 (which works for any integer ) if calculated using . This is because the folded GCF folds each pair of fractions from the unfolded GCF into one fraction, thus doubling the convergence pace. The Manny Sardina reference further explains "folded" continued fractions.
Note: Using the continued fraction for  cited above with the best-known Machin-like formula provides an even more rapidly, although still linearly, converging expression:

Roots of positive numbers

The th root of any positive number  can be expressed by restating , resulting in

which can be simplified, by folding each pair of fractions into one fraction, to

which can be simplified by noting that :

Example 1
The cube root of two (21/3 or  ≈ 1.259921...) can be calculated in two ways:

Example 2

Example 3
The twelfth root of two (21/12 or  ≈ 1.059463...), using "standard notation":

Example 4
Equal temperament's perfect fifth (27/12 or  ≈ 1.498307...), with :

With "standard notation":

More details on this technique can be found in General Method for Extracting Roots using (Folded) Continued Fractions.

Higher dimensions

Another meaning for generalized continued fraction is a generalization to higher dimensions. For example, there is a close relationship between the simple continued fraction in canonical form for the irrational real number , and the way lattice points in two dimensions lie to either side of the line . Generalizing this idea, one might ask about something related to lattice points in three or more dimensions. One reason to study this area is to quantify the mathematical coincidence idea; for example, for monomials in several real numbers, take the logarithmic form and consider how small it can be.  Another reason is to find a possible solution to Hermite's problem.

There have been numerous attempts to construct a generalized theory. Notable efforts in this direction were made by Felix Klein (the Klein polyhedron), Georges Poitou and George Szekeres.

See also
 Gauss's continued fraction
 Padé table
 Solving quadratic equations with continued fractions
 Convergence problem
 Infinite compositions of analytic functions

Notes

References

 (Covers both analytic theory and history.)

 (Covers primarily analytic theory and some arithmetic theory.)

 (This reprint of the D. Van Nostrand edition of 1948 covers both history and analytic theory.)

External links

Continued fractions

he:שבר משולב